is a Japanese footballer who last played for Air India FC.

Person 
Started playing soccer in elementary school, at the National High School Football Championship 79th of high school age Kusatsu higashi highschool. Chosen as an excellent tournament player, also elected a member of the expedition Europe. After graduating from high school, go on to Kinki University, when he was a captain of the 4th year.

After graduating from university, across Germany, joined SSV Eintracht Überherrn e. To V.. 

Currently involved in football do the job for the Japanese in Germany. (From the blog of the person)

External links
 His official blog

1982 births
Living people
Japanese footballers
Japanese expatriate sportspeople in India
Expatriate footballers in India
Expatriate footballers in Germany
I-League players
Air India FC players

Association football midfielders